The Highland Railway's Clan Class was a class of passenger 4-6-0 steam locomotives designed by Christopher Cumming.  The design is derived from that of the slightly earlier Clan Goods although the similarity is more visual than real. The first four were built in 1919, and the remaining four in 1921.

Dimensions
Bearing in mind that they probably spent a large part of their time slogging uphill or coasting down this was probably not too important.

Oil firing
Early in 1921 Clan Stewart was used for experiments with oil firing. This seems to have been successful, but was not applied to any other locomotives. Just when Clan Stewart reverted to coal operation does not seem to be recorded.

Transfer to LMS
The locomotives passed to the London, Midland and Scottish Railway (LMS) in 1923. 
The LMS classified them '4P'.

Transfer to BR
Two survived into British Railways (BR) hands in 1948, but only Clan Mackinnon received its BR number. Some of the Clan names were later reapplied to the BR Standard Class 6.

Numbering

References

Clan Class
4-6-0 locomotives
Hawthorn Leslie and Company locomotives
Railway locomotives introduced in 1919
Scrapped locomotives
Passenger locomotives